Collene Lamonte is a Democratic politician from Michigan who served in the Michigan House of Representatives.

Prior to her election to the Legislature, Lamonte was a high school math and science teacher for the Muskegon Public Schools.

In 2014, she lost her re-election bid to Holly Hughes, whom she had defeated in 2012, by only 58 votes. They faced each other again in 2016 with Hughes winning by an increased margin.

In 2018 she ran for the open 34th Senate seat, however she was upset in the Democratic primary by first time candidate Poppy Sias-Hernandez. Coincidentally, her old rival Hughes also lost in the primary for the same seat.

References

Living people
Democratic Party members of the Michigan House of Representatives
Women state legislators in Michigan
People from Montague, Michigan
Year of birth missing (living people)
Schoolteachers from Michigan
American women educators
21st-century American women